Bootlegged in Japan is a live album from British extreme metal band Napalm Death, released in June 1998 through Earache.

Background
The album features a concert from the 5 August 1996 at the Liquid Rooms, Tokyo. It was recorded as a bootleg and after the band received the recording, they found it was good enough to release it as an actual and official live album. In the inlay of the album the band wrote:

Release

Bootlegged in Japan was part of a 3-CD set together with the album Diatribes and the EP Greed Killing Earache re-released in 2010.

Track listing

Personnel

Napalm Death
 Mark "Barney" Greenway – lead vocals
 Jesse Pintado – lead guitar
 Mitch Harris – rhythm guitar, backing vocals
 Shane Embury – bass, backing vocals
 Danny Herrera – drums

References

Napalm Death live albums
1998 live albums